Evgeni Viktorovich Mitkov (born 23 March 1972 in Shelekhov) is a Russian volleyball player who competed in the 2000 Summer Olympics.

He was born in Shelekhov.

In 2000 he was part of the Russian team which won the silver medal in the Olympic tournament. He played all eight matches.

External links

External links

 
 
 

1972 births
Living people
People from Irkutsk Oblast
Russian men's volleyball players
Olympic volleyball players of Russia
Volleyball players at the 2000 Summer Olympics
Olympic silver medalists for Russia
Ural Ufa volleyball players
Olympic medalists in volleyball
Medalists at the 2000 Summer Olympics
Sportspeople from Irkutsk Oblast